The yellow-rumped siskin (Spinus uropygialis) is a species of finch in the family Fringillidae.
It is found in Argentina, Bolivia, Chile, and Peru.
Its natural habitats are subtropical or tropical moist montane forests and subtropical or tropical high-altitude shrubland.

Phylogeny

It has been obtained by Antonio Arnaiz-Villena et al.

References

yellow-rumped siskin
Birds of the Southern Andes
yellow-rumped siskin
yellow-rumped siskin
Taxonomy articles created by Polbot